Faustino is a given name and a surname.  Notable people with the name include:

Given name 
 Faustino Bocchi (1659–1742), Italian painter, who specialized in bizarre paintings of dwarfs
Faustino Arévalo (1747–1824), Spanish Jesuit hymnographer and patrologist
Domingo Faustino Sarmiento (1811-1888) Argentine statesman, intellectual, writer and activist. Former President of Argentina (1868-1874)
Faustino Aguilar (1882–1955), pioneering Filipino novelist, journalist, revolutionary, union leader, and editor
 Faustino Alonso (born 1961), Paraguayan football forward
 Faustino Amiano (1944–2020), Spanish rower
 Faustino Asprilla (born 1969), former Colombian football player, known as The Octopus
 Faustino Rodríguez-San Pedro (1833–1925), Spanish politician
 Faustino Galicia (died 1877), the most active scholar of the Nahuatl language of the 19th century
 Faustino Harrison (1900–1963), Uruguayan political figure
 Faustino Imbali (born 1956), Guinea-Bissau politician who was Prime Minister of Guinea-Bissau from 21 March 2001 to 9 December 2001
 Faustino Oramas (1911–2007), a Cuban singer, tres guitarist and composer
 Faustino Piaggio (1844–1924), Italian industrialist who also became a pioneer of the Latin American oil industry
 Faustino Raineri (died 1755), Italian painter, mainly a landscape painter of the Baroque period
 Faustino Rayo (died 1875), assassin of President of Ecuador Gabriel Garcia Moreno
 Faustino Reyes (born 1975), former boxer from Spain
 Faustino Rupérez (born 1956), retired Spanish professional road racing cyclist
 Faustino Sainz Muñoz (born 1937), Spanish prelate of the Roman Catholic Church

Surname 
 Auri Dias Faustino (born 1973), Brazilian football defender
 David Faustino (born 1974), American actor and rap artist primarily known for his role as Bud Bundy on the sitcom Married with Children
 Gumersindo Ramírez Faustino, Equatoguinean political activist
 Lenny Faustino (born 1979), Canadian pair skater
 Tats Faustino, Filipino musical composer, arranger, producer, musical director, songwriter, singer, and multi-instrumentalist

Italian masculine given names
Spanish masculine given names